Yadaya (from Sanskrit ; variously spelt yadayar and yedaya) refers to supersticious magical rituals done to delay, neutralize or prevent misfortune, widely practiced in Myanmar (Burma). These rituals, which originate from Brahmanism, are guided and prescribed by soothsayers and astrologers, who use a combination of mathematical equations and astrology to formulate a "prescription" to avert misfortune. Modern Burmese leaders, including U Nu, Ne Win and Than Shwe and many government policy decisions are widely understood to have been influenced by yadaya rituals. Among Burmese Buddhists, yadaya is often linked to merit-making, as some prescriptive rituals involve seemingly "Buddhist" acts, although they are done to bypass karmic fate, which cannot be altered by ritual in Buddhist doctrine. Yadaya is closely associated to numerology, particularly the number nine, which is widely believed to be an auspicious number. Some scholars contend that yadaya originates to the Pagan period, first practiced by monks of the Ari sect, a form of Buddhism that predates the introduction of Theravada Buddhism in Burma.

One notable form of yadaya is the construction of pagodas, as seen in the construction of 60,000 pagodas by U Nu in 1961. The government's unexplained decision to change the road traffic in 1970 to right-hand traffic (even though the overwhelming majority of Burmese cars are made for left-hand traffic) is one such incident believed to be the result of yadaya, to avert the threat of a political attack from the right and insurgency.

More recently, the unusual clothing choices, namely the wearing of traditional female acheik-patterned longyi (sarongs) by Than Shwe and other military generals at recent public appearances, including Union Day celebrations in February 2011 and at the reception of the Lao Prime Minister Bouasone Bouphavanh in June 2011 have also been attributed to yadaya, as a way to divert power to neutralize Aung San Suu Kyi's power.

See also
Yantra
Yantra tattooing

References

Burmese culture
Burmese words and phrases